Cantharellus is a genus of corals within the family Fungiidae.

Species 

 Cantharellus doederleini 
 Cantharellus jebbi 
 Cantharellus noumeae

References 

Fungiidae
Scleractinia genera